Hypercompe simplex is a moth of the family Erebidae first described by Francis Walker in 1855. It is found in Puerto Rico, as well as on the Virgin Islands and the Lesser Antilles.

The larvae feed on Cedrella, Cissus, Erechtotes, Erythrina, Ipomaea and Solanum torvum.

References

Hypercompe
Moths described in 1855